Diemenomyia is a genus of crane fly in the family Limoniidae.There are only two known species.

Distribution
Both known species are from Tasmania, Australia.

Species
D. bulbosa Alexander, 1928
D. praetenuis Alexander, 1928

References

Limoniidae
Nematocera genera
Diptera of Australasia